Ella Buchanan (July 14, 1867 – July 15, 1951) was an American sculptor. Born in Canada, she was trained at the Art Institute of Chicago, where she also taught from 1911 to 1915. She became a sculptor in Los Angeles, California, and she was the vice president of the Sculptors' Guild of Southern California. Her work was part of the sculpture event in the art competition at the 1932 Summer Olympics.

References

1867 births
1951 deaths
People from Cambridge, Ontario
School of the Art Institute of Chicago alumni
School of the Art Institute of Chicago faculty
American women sculptors
Artists from Los Angeles
Olympic competitors in art competitions
20th-century American sculptors
20th-century American women artists
American women academics